Princess Ingrid Alexandra of Norway (born 21 January 2004) is the eldest child of Crown Prince Haakon and Crown Princess Mette-Marit, and the grandchild of King Harald V. She is second in line of succession to the Norwegian throne after her father. She is expected to become the country's second female monarch, after the 15th-century Queen Margaret.

She represents the fifth generation of the sitting Norwegian royal family of the House of Glücksburg.

She has a younger brother, Prince Sverre Magnus, whom she ranks above in the line of succession after the implementation of absolute primogeniture in 1990.

Birth and baptism

Born on 21 January 2004 at 9:13 am in The National Hospital, part of the Oslo University Hospital in Oslo, Princess Ingrid Alexandra is the first child and only daughter of Crown Prince Haakon, heir apparent to the throne, and the second granddaughter of King Harald V and Queen Sonja. Her mother, Crown Princess Mette-Marit, has a son named Marius Borg Høiby, born in 1997 from a previous relationship. Following Ingrid Alexandra's birth, the already well-regarded royal family experienced an upsurge of popularity.

Ingrid Alexandra was baptised by Bishop Gunnar Stålsett in the chapel of the Royal Palace on 17 April 2004. Her grandfather the King, her aunt Princess Märtha Louise, the Crown Prince of Denmark, the Crown Princess of Sweden, the then Prince of Asturias, and her maternal grandmother Marit Tjessem were her godparents. The Crown Prince of Denmark and the Prince of Asturias were unable to attend the christening due to their respective weddings scheduled to occur within a month of the christening.

On 31 August 2019, Ingrid Alexandra was confirmed in the Palace Chapel in Oslo with all her godparents present.

Education 
Ingrid Alexandra started her first day of school on 19 August 2010 at Jansløkka elementary school, a local state school attended by her half-brother. Her parents chose the school because they wanted her to have as ordinary a childhood as possible. Newspaper reports said Princess Ingrid Alexandra would walk to school with her half-brother, and local citizens could expect to see her occasionally out in the community with her classmates on school outings. School officials hoped to make the school a place where the princess could make friends and enjoy some relief from public scrutiny.

On 17 June 2014, the Norwegian Royal Family notified the public that from the start of the 2014–2015 school year, Princess Ingrid Alexandra would transfer to the private English-language Oslo International School, reportedly because her parents wanted her to be fluent in English. Her younger brother, Sverre Magnus, was to transfer to Oslo's Montessori school.

Princess Ingrid Alexandra was transferred to Oslo's Uranienborg School to complete her lower secondary education. In the fall of 2020 she began further schooling at Elvebakken Upper Secondary School in Oslo.

Activities
On 19 June 2010, Princess Ingrid Alexandra served as a bridesmaid at the wedding of her godmother, the Crown Princess of Sweden. In December 2012, the Princess attended an interview with her father by a Norwegian television programme in aid of Environmental Agents, the children's environmental organization. Her mother was supposed to attend, but the Crown Prince attended instead as the Crown Princess was ill. She has taken part in traditional celebrations of the Constitution Day, as well as the traditional ski jumping tournament at Holmenkollen in Oslo.

On 4 May 2015, Princess Ingrid Alexandra christened the Norwegian Rescue Company's new lifeboat, Elias, in her first royal assignment. Accompanied by her grandfather the King, she was made godmother of the boat.

On 19 May 2016, the Princess Ingrid Alexandra Sculpture Park opened in the Palace Park, as part of the celebration of the King and Queen's 25th anniversary.  It features sculptures made for children and by children. The Princess takes active part herself in choosing the designs from among the contributions to the sculpture park from school children all over Norway. In 2018, she gave a guided tour of the park to the Duke and Duchess of Cambridge, on the occasion of their official visit to Norway. 

On 12 February 2016, the Princess and her grandfather participated in the opening ceremony of the II Winter Youth Olympics in Lillehammer: the King, as he previously did in 1994 Winter Olympics, declared the Games opened, while the Princess, like her father Crown Prince Haakon did 22 years before, lit the cauldron.

On 17 November 2018, Princess Ingrid Alexandra christened the research vessel Kronprins Haakon, which was named after her father. The vessel was christened at its home port of Tromsø. The princess spoke of her interest in the ocean and climate change, which motivated her in christening the ship. She stated that the ship will bring "new and crucial knowledge about the polar areas, about the oceans and about climate change."

The Princess won a gold medal in the Norwegian surfing championship for juniors in October 2020. She is known as an avid surfer, and she also trains at skiing and kickboxing.

On 20 January 2022, the Princess visited the three branches of the Norwegian government; the Storting, the Supreme Court and the office of the prime minister. These visits were part of a series of activities Princess Ingrid Alexandra undertook ahead of her 18th birthday the next day. Her father, Crown Prince Haakon, did the same on his own 18th birthday in 1991. On the day of her birthday on 21 January, she attended a meeting of the Council of State alongside Crown Prince Haakon and King Harald. This was followed by a series of congratulatory deputations from Norwegian officials at the Royal Palace. The Princess received congratulations from representatives of the governmental branches as well as the Sámi Parliament, county governors, the diplomatic corps, the Norwegian Armed Forces and the Church of Norway. Cannon salutes were fired at noon to mark Ingrid Alexandra's birthday. On 16 June, the government held a dinner to mark her 18th birthday at the Oslo Public Library. On 17 June, a gala dinner was hosted by her grandparents, the King and Queen, at the Royal Palace. Guests from many European royal houses attended.

Constitutional status 
The Constitution of Norway was altered in 1990 to introduce absolute primogeniture, ensuring that the crown would pass to the eldest child regardless of sex but keeping the Crown Prince ahead of his elder sister, Princess Märtha Louise; the change was to apply for the first time to their children. Princess Ingrid Alexandra has thus been second in the line of succession since birth, preceded only by her father. Because of the reform, her status was not affected by the subsequent birth of her brother, Prince Sverre Magnus, in 2005. The Princess is expected to become Norway's first female monarch since Queen Margaret, who reigned over Norway, Denmark and Sweden from the late 1380s until her death in 1412.

Along with her parents and grandparents – but unlike her brother, maternal half-brother Marius, and other relatives – Princess Ingrid Alexandra is a member of the Norwegian Royal House. The family belongs to the House of Glücksburg.

Titles, styles, honours and arms

Titles and styles
21 January 2004 – present:
Her Royal Highness Princess Ingrid Alexandra of Norway
Her Royal Highness The Princess

Honours

Norwegian honours
 : Grand Cross of the Royal Norwegian Order of St. Olav (21 January 2022)
 : Recipient of the Royal Family Order of King Harald V (21 January 2022)
 : Recipient of the Royal House Centennial Medal (25 November 2005)
 : Recipient of King Harald V's Jubilee Medal 1991-2016 (17 January 2016)

Foreign honours
 : Knight of the Order of the Elephant (21 January 2022)

Arms

Princess Ingrid Alexandra's monogram was designed by Queen Margrethe II of Denmark, her grandfather's second cousin who is known for her artistic talents.

References

External links
Official website of Her Royal Highness Princess Ingrid Alexandra

2004 births
Living people
House of Glücksburg (Norway)
Norwegian princesses
Ingrid
Norwegian people of German descent
Norwegian people of English descent
Norwegian people of Danish descent
Norwegian people of Swedish descent
Norwegian people of French descent
Norwegian surfers